East Patchogue is a census-designated place (CDP) in the Town of Brookhaven in Suffolk County, on the South Shore of Long Island, in New York, United States. The population was 22,469 at the 2010 census. The CDP is a proximate representation of the East Patchogue hamlet used for statistical purposes of the Census Bureau.

History 
Patchogue has historically been a major shopping and commerce hub of Suffolk County. "Patchogue" in the narrow sense is an incorporated village with narrow limits, only about a mile and a half wide.  East Patchogue includes the eastern portion of Patchogue in the wider sense, as well as the area east of that but still west of the incorporated village of Bellport. This double meaning of "East Patchogue" is reflected in the naming of New York State Route 27A: It is called "East Main Street" in the western portion of East Patchogue, and "Montauk Highway" (as it typically is outside of villages) in the eastern portion.  The Patchogue side of East Patchogue is in the Patchogue-Medford School District, while the Bellport side is in the South Country Central School District, and its high-school students attend Bellport High School.

The area around County Road 80 in the western portion of East Patchogue was once commonly regarded as the hamlet of Hagerman. In New York, a hamlet has no official boundaries or government and refers only to a named, settled area. With suburban growth, Hagerman is no longer distinct from its surroundings, and the name has fallen into disuse, especially since the removal of the Hagerman station on the Long Island Rail Road. There still exists the Hagerman fire district.

Prior to its closure, the East Patchogue post office was located at 1415 Montauk Highway.

Geography

Demographics

As of the census of 2000, there were 20,824 people, 7,493 households, and 5,297 families residing in the CDP. The population density was 2,503.9 per square mile (966.4/km2). There were 7,760 housing units at an average density of 933.1/sq mi (360.1/km2). The racial makeup of the CDP was 89.48% White, 3.19% African American, 0.14% Native American, 1.94% Asian, 0.01% Pacific Islander, 3.25% from other races, and 1.98% from two or more races. Hispanic or Latino of any race were 9.10% of the population.

There were 7,493 households, out of which 31.4% had children under the age of 18 living with them, 56.6% were married couples living together, 9.6% had a female householder with no husband present, and 29.3% were non-families. 23.3% of all households were made up of individuals, and 11.9% had someone living alone who was 65 years of age or older. The average household size was 2.71 and the average family size was 3.21.

In the CDP, the population was spread out, with 23.1% under the age of 18, 7.7% from 18 to 24, 30.4% from 25 to 44, 23.9% from 45 to 64, and 14.9% who were 65 years of age or older. The median age was 38 years. For every 100 females, there were 94.8 males. For every 100 females age 18 and over, there were 90.9 males.

The median income for a household in the CDP was $57,237, and the median income for a family was $64,323. Males had a median income of $45,274 versus $31,704 for females. The per capita income for the CDP was $23,619. About 2.5% of families and 4.5% of the population were below the poverty threshold, including 4.0% of those under age 18 and 9.7% of those age 65 or over.

Historic sites
The Smith-Rourke House and Swan River Schoolhouse are listed on the National Register of Historic Places. The Avery Homestead (also known as the Swan River Nursery), is listed as a threatened site sought for restoration by Preservation Long Island.

Pine Neck boat ramp

Pine Neck Avenue boat ramp and fishing pier are on the south shore of East Patchogue. Accessible by the Swan River at the south end of Pine Neck Avenue, this is a main boat access ramp off the Swan River inlet, connecting the Patchogue Bay and Great South Bay, in south central Long Island.

It is an undeveloped Park in the Township of Brookhaven, Suffolk County. Boaters travel from Blue Point, on the westernmost tip of Patchogue Bay, to Howell's Point, on the eastern side of the bay. Seasonal permits are required for residents to launch their boats. The park can accommodate around 50 cars and trucks.

Pine Neck Avenue Park is on the central shore of Patchogue Bay, and is due north of Watch Hill and Davis Park. The Fire Island National Seashore is one of the Barrier Islands and is a recreational destination for many south shore boaters.

The Park offers a natural beach, fishing pier, two boat ramps, and an adjacent undeveloped shoreline called "40 acres". Pine Neck gives residents and visitors alike access and scenic views into Long Island's Great South Bay.

Notable people

 Daniel J. Bernstein, programmer, professor of mathematics and computer science. 
 Giovanni Capitello, filmmaker/actor - was born in Brooklyn and raised in East Patchogue.  
 Neal Heaton, baseball pitcher for numerous teams, including the New York Yankees (1993), lives in East Patchogue.

See also 

Patchogue, New York
Patchogue Bay
Swan River
Swan Lake Park
Hagerman, New York

References

External links

Pine Neck Avenue Boat Ramp (Long Island.com)
Long Island Boat Ramps (Bayfisherman.com)
Southern New York Boat Ramp list (The Fishing Line)
New York State Department of Environmental Conservation
Boat Launch Sites for Suffolk County
Long Island Boat Ramp Guide

Brookhaven, New York
Hamlets in New York (state)
Census-designated places in New York (state)
Census-designated places in Suffolk County, New York
Hamlets in Suffolk County, New York
Populated coastal places in New York (state)